The Murphy Windmill is a functioning windmill in Golden Gate Park, San Francisco, California, United States. It was completed in 1908, and placed on the San Francisco Designated Landmark list in 2000.

Location 
The windmill is south of Dutch Windmill on the western edge of Golden Gate Park in San Francisco, California.

History
In the 1870s and 1880s, Golden Gate Park was planted on sand dunes and required substantial irrigation. In 1902, the Park Commission authorized the construction of two windmills to pump groundwater for park irrigation rather than purchasing water at exorbitant costs from the Spring Valley Water Company. The Murphy Mill was completed in 1908, and pumped 40,000 gallons per day to the park.

Electric water pumps replaced the need for windmills in 1913, and the mill fell into disrepair. By the 1950s, the mill was in a state of ruin. In 1964, the San Francisco Citizens Commission for the Restoration of the Golden Gate Park Windmills was formed and led by Eleanor Rossi Crabtree, daughter of former San Francisco mayor Angelo Rossi. Plans for the Murphy Mill restoration began in 2002, with a reopening in 2012.

It was placed on the San Francisco Designated Landmark list on July 2, 2000.

Events 
Since 2012 the Dutch community in the Bay Area celebrates King's Day every year at the end of April near Murphy Mill. The event celebrates Dutch culture and traditions, including old Dutch kids games, flea market, Dutch food, beer, music, and dancing.

See also
Dutch Windmill
List of windmills in the United States

References

External links

 Murphy Windmill and Millwright Cottage - San Francisco Recreation & Parks Department

Golden Gate Park
Buildings and structures in San Francisco
Windmills in California
Windmills completed in 1908
1900s architecture in the United States
San Francisco Designated Landmarks
Agricultural buildings and structures in California
1908 establishments in California
Wind power in California